Squid is eaten in many cuisines; in English, the culinary name calamari is often used for squid dishes. There are many ways to prepare and cook squid. Fried squid is common in the Mediterranean.  In New Zealand, Australia, the United States, Canada, and South Africa, it is sold in fish and chip shops. In Britain, it can be found in Mediterranean 'calamari' or Asian 'salt and pepper fried squid' forms in various establishments, often served as a bar snack, street food, or starter.

Squid can be prepared for consumption in a number of other ways. In Korea, it is sometimes served raw, and elsewhere it is used as sushi, sashimi and tempura items, grilled, stuffed, covered in batter, stewed in gravy and served in stir-fries, rice, and noodle dishes. Dried shredded squid is a common snack in some Asian regions, including East Asia.

Use

The body (mantle) can be stuffed whole, cut into flat pieces or sliced into rings. The arms, tentacles, and ink are edible; the only parts of the squid that are not eaten are its beak and gladius (pen).

Asia 

In Chinese and Southeast Asian cuisine, squid is used in stir-fries, rice, and noodle dishes. It may be heavily spiced.

In China, Thailand, and Japan squid is grilled whole and sold in food stalls.

Pre-packaged dried shredded squid or cuttlefish are snack items in Hong Kong, Taiwan, Korea, Japan, China and Russia, often shredded to reduce chewiness.

Japan 
In Japan, squid is used in almost every type of dish, including sushi, sashimi, and tempura. It can also be marinated in soy sauce (ika okizuke), stewed (nabemono), and grilled (ikayaki).

Korea 
In Korea, squid is sometimes killed and served quickly. Unlike octopus, squid tentacles do not usually continue to move when reaching the table. This fresh squid is 산 오징어 (san ojingeo) (also with small octopuses called nakji). The squid is served with Korean mustard, soy sauce, chili sauce, or sesame sauce. It is salted and wrapped in lettuce or perilla leaves. Squid is also marinated in hot pepper sauce and cooked on a pan (Nakji Bokum or Ojingeo Bokum/Ojingeo-chae-bokkeum). They are also served by food stands as a snack food, battered and deep fried or grilled using hot skillets. They are also cut up into small pieces to be added to 해물파전 (Korean Seafood Pancake) or a variety of spicy seafood soups. Dried squid may also accompany alcoholic beverages as anju. Dried squid is served with peanuts. Squid is roasted and served with hot pepper paste or mayonnaise as a dip. Steamed squid and boiled squid are delicacies.

Also in Korea, squid is made into jeotgal (salted seafood). The ojingeo-jeot, thin strips of skinned, gutted, washed, salted, and fermented squid seasoned with spicy gochugaru (chili powder)-based spices and minced aromatic vegetables, is a popular banchan (side dish) served in small quantities as an accompaniment to bap (cooked rice). In Japan, similar dish is called ika-no-shiokara. The heavily salted squid (usually sparkling enope (firefly) squid or Spear Squid), sometimes with innards, ferments for as long as a month, and is preserved in small jars. This salty, strong flavoured item is served in small quantities as an accompaniment to white rice or alcoholic beverages.

Philippines 
In the Philippines, squid is cooked as adobong pusit, squid in adobo sauce, along with the ink, imparting a tangy flavour, especially with fresh chillies. Battered squid rings, which is also sold as a popular deep-fried street food called calamares in the Philippines, is served with alioli, mayonnaise or chilli vinegar. Squid is grilled on charcoal, brushed with a soy sauce-based marinade, and stuffed with tomato and onions. Another recipe is rellenong pusit, stuffed with finely-chopped vegetables, squid fat, and ground pork. A variant of pancit noodles is pancit pusit, which is pancit bihon with squid added, along with the ink, giving the noodles its dark color.

South Asia 
In India and Sri Lanka, squid or cuttlefish is eaten in coastal areas for example, in Kerala and Tamil Nadu. Squid are eaten deep fried (Koonthal Fry) or as squid gravy (koonthal varattiyathu/Roast). In Kerala and Tamil Nadu, squid is called koonthal, kanava or kadamba. In Coastal Karnataka, squid is also called bondaas.

Middle East 
In Egypt, Cyprus,  and Turkey, squid rings and arms are coated in batter and fried in oil. Other recipes from these regions simmer squid with vegetables. Squid is also often stuffed.

In Lebanon, Syria,  Turkey, fried squid is served with tarator, a sauce made using tahini. Like many seafood dishes, it may be served with a slice of lemon.

Europe

Southern Europe 
Fried squid (calamari fritti) is a dish in Mediterranean cuisine. It consists of batter-coated squid, deep-fried for less than two minutes to prevent toughness. It is served plain, with salt and lemon on the side.

In Spain, (rabas or calamares a la romana, battered calamari, lit. Roman-style calamari) has the calamari rings covered in a thick batter, deep fried and served with lemon juice and mayonnaise or aioli. Traditionally in Cantabria and the Basque Country rabas are cut into straight strips rather than rings. Battered and fried baby squid is known as puntillitas. Squid stewed in its own black ink is called calamares en su tinta or chipirones en su tinta, resulting in a black stew-like dish in which squid meat is very tender and is accompanied by a thick black sauce, usually made with onion, tomato and squid ink, among others.

In Spain and Italy, squid or cuttlefish ink is eaten in dishes such as paella, risotto, soups and pasta.

In Spain, Italy, Greece, Cyprus, Turkey, Portugal, Slovenia and Croatia, squid rings and arms are coated in batter and fried in oil. Other recipes from these regions feature squid (or octopus) simmered slowly, with vegetables such as squash or tomato. When frying, the squid flesh is kept tender due to a short cooking time. When simmering, the flesh is most tender when cooking is prolonged with reduced temperature. In Greece or Cyprus it is served also with tzatziki, a Greek yoghurt, cucumber and mint dip.

In Sardinia, squid are served with a sauce made from lemon, garlic, parsley, and olive oil.

In Portugal, lulas are commonly eaten grilled whole, in kebabs ("espetadas") of squid rings with bell peppers and onion, or stewed, stuffed with minced meat ("Lulas Recheadas"). The battered version is known as 'lulas à sevilhana', named after Seville, the Andalusian city that popularised the dish. The city of Setúbal is also known for its fried cuttlefish (Choco frito 'à setubalense''').

In Malta, klamar mimli involves stuffing the squid with rice, breadcrumbs, parsley, garlic and capers and then gently stewing in red wine.

In Slovenia, squid are eaten grilled and stuffed with pršut and cheese, with blitva (Swiss chard).

 Russia 
In Russia, a lightly boiled julienned squid with onion rings, garnished with mayonnaise, makes a salad. Another dish is a squid stuffed with rice and vegetables and then roasted.

 Commonwealth 
In South Africa, Australia and New Zealand, fried calamari is popular in fish and chip shops; imitation calamari of white fish may also be used.

 North America 
In North America, fried squid is a staple in seafood restaurants. It is served as an appetizer, garnished with parsley, or sprinkled with parmesan cheese. It is served with dips: peppercorn mayonnaise, tzatziki, marinara sauce, tartar sauce, or cocktail sauce. In Mexico it is served with Tabasco sauce or habanero. Other dips, such as ketchup, aioli, and olive oil are used.  In the United States, the government and industry worked together to popularize calamari consumption in the 1990s.

In the United States, in an attempt to popularize squid as a protein source in the 1970s, researchers at Massachusetts Institute of Technology developed a squid-gutting machine, and submitted squid cocktail, rings, and chowder to a 70-person tasting panel for market research. Despite a general lack of popularity of squid in the United States, as aside from the internal "ethnic market" polling had shown a negative public perception of squid foods, the tasting panel gave the dishes "high marks".

During the 2020 Democratic National Convention, calamari was featured prominently during the virtual roll call for the state of Rhode Island.

Etymology
The English name calamari comes from the Italian calamari (plural of calamaro), Spanish calamar, and Modern Greek  kalamári. Ultimately, all of these terms derive from the Late Latin calamarium, "pen case" or "ink pot", itself from the Latin calamarius, "pertaining to a writing-reed", after the resemblance in shape and the inky fluid that squid secrete; calamarius in turn derives from the Greek  kalamos'' 'reed' or 'pen'.

Nutritional value
The nutritional value of squid compares favorably with fishes, having high content of protein and phosphorus with traces of calcium, thiamine, and riboflavin. Squid are 67.5–80.7% protein and 2.22–8.48% fat. A 2016 study of loligo squid found that 13% of the wet weight was oil, which was a rich source of omega-3 and omega-6 fatty acids (2.78% arachidonic acid, 3.10% linolenic acid, 5.20% linoleic acid, 15.40% docosahexaenoic acid (DHA), and 9.60% eicosapentaenoic acid (EPA)).

Allergies
Allergies to calamari can occur. As with other molluscs, the allergen is probably tropomyosin.

Gallery

See also

 Fish as food
 List of deep fried foods
 List of seafood dishes
 Octopus as food
 Pain in invertebrates

References

External links

Appetizers
Animal-based seafood
Chinese cuisine
Japanese cuisine
Korean cuisine
Vietnamese cuisine
Philippine cuisine
Lao cuisine
Thai cuisine
Sri Lankan seafood dishes
French cuisine
Portuguese cuisine
Greek cuisine
Spanish cuisine
Italian cuisine
Seafood
Deep fried foods
 
Tapas
Molluscs as food